The Track & Field News Athlete of the Year award is given to track and field athletes by Track & Field News magazine, an American sports magazine. A panel of international track and field experts organized by the magazine selects the winners. The award has been given to men since 1959 and women since 1974.

Winners

References

Winner lists
 List of Men's athlete of the year winners
List of women's athlete of the year winners

Sport of athletics awards
Most valuable player awards
1959 establishments in the United States
Awards established in 1959